The 1930 San Sebastián Grand Prix was a Grand Prix motor race held at the Circuito Lasarte on 5 October 1930. The Italian driver Achille Varzi won the race in a works Maserati, ahead of his teammate Aymo Maggi and the privateer Peugeot of Henri Stoffel.

Entries

Starting grid

Note: grid slots were allocated in numerical order.

Classification

Race

References

1930 in Grand Prix racing
1930 in Spanish motorsport
Motorsport in Spain